Matteo Vanetta (born 6 August 1978) is a Swiss football coach and a former player. He was most recently head coach of Swiss Super League side BSC Young Boys.

Vanetta has previously played for AC Lugano, FC Sion, FC Servette and FC Aarau in the Swiss Super League.

References

1978 births
Living people
Swiss men's footballers
FC Sion players
Servette FC players
FC Lugano players
FC Aarau players
FC Chiasso players
Swiss Super League players
Swiss people of Italian descent
Étoile Carouge FC players
Place of birth missing (living people)
Association football defenders